Kamal Ali Hassan (July 14, 1924 – 3 June 1984) was an Egyptian former diver. He competed at the 1952 Summer Olympics.

References 

Egyptian male divers
Olympic divers of Egypt
Divers at the 1952 Summer Olympics
1924 births
1984 deaths
Egyptian expatriates in the United States
20th-century Egyptian people